Émile Jonassaint (May 20, 1913 – October 24, 1995) was a Haitian Supreme Court Justice and politician who served as President of the Constituent Assembly during the 1987 Constitution and President of Haiti for five months.

Jonassaint served as Head of the Provisional Government of Haiti president of Haiti for five months (May 12 and October 12) in 1994 after the military regime had forced Jean-Bertrand Aristide, the elected president, out of the country in 1991. It is alleged by President Aristide sympathizers that during his presidency, the military conducted some of the harshest human rights abuses.

Throughout 1994 the U.S. government put pressure on the repressive Haitian military Leaders to resign and allow the elected president, Jean-Bertrand Aristide, to return to the country. Under the Haitian Constitution of 1987, if for whatever reason the president cannot discharge of his duties, his authority will be vested unto the Cabinet presided by the Prime Minister. It so happened that the Prime Minister at the time Rene Preval had left the country under a tumultuous series of convocation by the Parliament (duly elected as well) requesting that he comes to their chambers to answer allegations of fraud and abuses of power among other things. Parliamentary leaders wanted to give the Prime Minister a vote of no confidence, asking for his resignation, de facto. Instead of appearing in front of the Parliament, the Prime Minister decided to defy the third branch and its power and his good friend, President Aristide, usurping the powers not delegated to the Executive branch or him under the Constitution, went to the Parliamentary chambers and threaten the leaders of that body. Some were beaten by his supporters, had their houses ransacked, and had their lives threatened. President Aristide became a destabilizing force. Some military leaders arrested the President and deported him to Venezuela. The military has often interfered in civilian life for its own purpose. Therefore, Article 148 of the Constitution could not be enforced, and under Article 149, a Provisional government was formed with a senior member of the Cour de Cassation. In May, the United Nations Security Council called for all necessary means to be taken for the return of elected President Jean-Bertrand Aristide to power -- (Resolution 917). About 100 UN monitors went to the Dominican Republic-Haiti border in mid-August to stop oil smuggling, which was sustaining the Haitian military leaders.

In response, Émile Jonassaint declared a state of siege and accused the world of having "declared war on poor Haiti, which has harmed nobody." Throughout August, the army and its paramilitary ally, the 'Front for the Advancement and Progress of Haiti,' continued to presumably murder some Aristide supporters while organizing parades of "volunteers" to fight an invasion.

On September 18, 1994 Dr. Robert S. Westcott received an invitation from President Jonassaint for a mission of fact including former president Jimmy Carter, former chairman of the Joint Chiefs of Staff Gen. Colin Powell, Sen. Sam Nunn, and 3 others to negotiate the return of President Jean-Bertrand Aristide with Emile Jonassaint, Head of the Provisional Government in Haiti. Emile Jonassaint signed what is known as the Port-au-Prince Accord and step down as Head of the Provisional Government of Haiti upon the return of the elected president. On October 24, 1995, Jonassaint died at the age of 82.

External links 
  MISSION TO HAITI: POLITICS; Haiti's Military Peruses Fine Print of Accord in Bid to Hold Onto Power  By LARRY ROHTER The New York Times
 Haiti's Rulers Are Defiant Despite Threat of Invasion By Douglas Farah The Washington Post
 Carter Center Article about Jimmy Carter's trip to Haiti
 Washington Post story about death of Emile Jonassaint

References 

 http://www.britannica.com/eb/article-9112160/Jonassaint-Emile

Presidents of Haiti
1913 births
1995 deaths
Haitian judges
People from Port-au-Prince
1990s in Haiti
20th-century Haitian politicians